New Carlisle, Quebec is a town in the Gaspésie–Îles-de-la-Madeleine region of Quebec, Canada. It best known as the boyhood home of René Lévesque although he was born in Campbellton, New Brunswick. Its population is approximately 1,388, most of which anglophone but many of which is francophone. New Carlisle is located on the Baie des Chaleurs.

New Carlisle is the seat of Bonaventure Regional County Municipality, the judicial district of Bonaventure, and the regional base for the Ministry of Transports Quebec, which has an operations centre on the outskirts of town.  New Carlisle has a post office, primary and high schools, five different churches and many services. Via Rail mothballed its operations between Matapédia and New Carlisle sometime   around 2010.

History

The site of the town was selected in 1784 by the Lieutenant-Governor of the jurisdictional District of Gaspe, Nicholas Cox, named Cox Township. The town as is thought to have been named after Cox's home town, possibly Carlisle in England, soon after, the name was changed from "Carlisle" to "New Carlisle". The original settlers of 1784 were discharged soldiers of British Army regiments and Loyalists claimants. In 1877, the place was incorporated when the Township Municipality of Cox was dissolved into the Municipalities of New Carlisle and Paspébiac.
Senator Theodore Robitallie was elected as a member from Bonaventure County and during his time in the federal government he commissioned the Words and music for O'Canada in 1885.

The town was the scene of the capture of German spy Werner von Janowski, who was dropped from a nearby U-boat in November, 1942.

Demographics

Population

Language
Mother tongue:
 English as first language: 62.8%
 French as first language: 34.9%
 English and French as first language: 1.1%
 Other as first language: 1.1%

Climate

See also
 List of municipalities in Quebec

References

Incorporated places in Gaspésie–Îles-de-la-Madeleine
Municipalities in Quebec
Populated coastal places in Canada